The History of the Kings, or Brut y Brenhinedd, is a Welsh translation of Geoffrey of Monmouth’s Historia Regum Britanniae (History of the Kings of Britain). The manuscript, which was copied in the late fifteenth century, is probably the only illustrated Welsh-language medieval narrative. It is part of the Peniarth Manuscripts collection at the National Library of Wales (Peniarth Ms. 23C). 

The text of Peniarth 23C is written on parchment and decorated with fifty-nine illustrations, of which fifty-seven are of kings, and some illuminated initial letters, including zoomorphic forms. It is probable that it was produced in North Wales.

References

External links

Welsh manuscripts
Peniarth collection
Medieval Welsh literature
Welsh-language literature
Welsh mythology